Dorymyrmex flavopectus is a species of ant in the genus Dorymyrmex. Described by Smith in 1944, the species is endemic to the United States and Mexico.

References

Dorymyrmex
Hymenoptera of North America
Insects described in 1944